Battle of Verkiai fought in autumn of 1658 between the Polish–Lithuanian Commonwealth and the Tsardom of Russia marked the resumption of hostilities in the Russo-Polish War (1654–67); it ended with Russian victory. 

Russians, close to signing a peace treaty with Sweden (truce of Valiersari ending the Russo–Swedish War (1656–58)) decided to resume the war with Poland in order to gain control over the disputed Ruthenian territories. After the inconclusive negotiations with the Poles in Vilnius, army of prince Yury Dolgorukov attacked the Polish units guarding the Polish delegations near Verkiai. Polish troops were taken by surprise and were defeated, Russians took many prisoners, including the Polish leader, hetman Wincenty Korwin Gosiewski; Gosiewski would remain a hostage for four years. Another Polish commander, hetman Paweł Jan Sapieha, would be later blamed for not coming to the aid of Gosiewski due to personal friction between them.

References

 Łukasz Ossoliński, "Kampania na Ukrainie 1660 roku"; doctoral thesis (University of Warsaw), 1995, available here

Verkiai
1658 in Europe
Verkiai
Military history of Vilnius
Verkiai
1658 in the Polish–Lithuanian Commonwealth